was a private junior college in Nakano, Tokyo, Japan. It was established in 1951, became coeducational in 2001, and closed in 2010.

See also
 List of junior colleges in Japan

External links
  

Japanese junior colleges
Universities and colleges in Tokyo